Steve Foster (born 1957) is an English international football player.

Steve Foster may also refer to:

Steve Foster (baseball) (born 1966), American baseball relief pitcher
Steve Foster (boxer) (born 1960), English boxer
Steve Foster (footballer, born 1974), English footballer and assistant manager at Whitley Bay
Steve Foster (singer) (1946–2018), Australian singer/songwriter and musician
Steven E. Foster, United States Air National Guard general

See also
Stephen Foster (disambiguation)